Atiyyah Ramadan Ellison [ah-TEE-ah] (born September 29, 1981) is a former American football defensive lineman. He was drafted by the Carolina Panthers in the third round of the 2005 NFL Draft. He played college football at Missouri.

Ellison has also been a member of the Houston Texans, Baltimore Ravens, San Francisco 49ers, Jacksonville Jaguars, Kansas City Chiefs, and New England Patriots.

He now works at the University of Missouri in Columbia, Missouri as the Director of Player Development - Football.

Early years
As a senior at Parkway South High School in St. Louis, Missouri, Ellison had three sacks and 47 tackles. He was ranked one of the top defensive lineman in the Midwest, won All-State honors, and was an All-Metro choice. Ellison also was a standout basketball player and received all-conference honors his senior year. He owns his high school shot put record and competed at the state track meet his junior and senior years.

Parkway South High School retired Ellison's jersey in 2006.

College career

Coffeyville Community College
Ellison attended Coffeyville Community College in Coffeyville, Kansas, for two seasons, where he redshirted in 2000. As a freshman in 2001, Ellison started 9 of 10 games, recording 57 tackles and five sacks. Inducted into the Coffeyville Hall of Fame in 2016.

University of Missouri
After community college, Ellison attended the University of Missouri, where as a sophomore in 2002 he played in 12 games (9 starts), finishing with 39 tackles and two forced fumbles at defensive end. In 2003, Ellison earned third-team All-Big 12 Conference honors after recording 72 tackles, four sacks, and two forced fumbles. As a senior in 2004, Ellison played in 11 games, finishing with 60 tackles and 2.5 sacks, earning first-team All-Big 12 honors.

Professional career

Carolina Panthers
Ellison was drafted by the Carolina Panthers in the third round (89th overall) of the 2005 NFL Draft. He was waived by Carolina during final cuts on September 3, 2005, and re-signed to their practice squad two days later. On September 14, 2005, he was promoted to the 53-man roster, but was waived again on September 24, 2005. He returned to the practice squad on September 27, 2005, and was elevated to the active roster again on October 31, 2005, where he spent the remainder of the season as an inactive. He was waived by the Panthers on September 2, 2006.

Houston Texans
The Houston Texans claimed Ellison off waivers on September 3, 2006, but waived him on September 7, 2006, before the start of the regular season.

Baltimore Ravens
Ellison was signed to the practice squad of the Baltimore Ravens on September 12, 2006, and was elevated to the 53-man roster on December 4, 2006. He was inactive for three games before being placed on injured reserve with a shoulder injury on December 30, 2006. He was waived by the Ravens on September 1, 2007, and re-signed to their practice squad the next day.

San Francisco 49ers
The San Francisco 49ers signed Ellison to their 53-man roster off the Ravens' practice squad on September 5, 2007. He was inactive for the entire 2007 season and was waived by the 49ers on August 30, 2008, and re-signed to the 49ers' practice squad the next day.

Jacksonville Jaguars
The Jacksonville Jaguars signed Ellison off the 49ers' practice squad on December 10, 2008, but he was inactive for the final three games of the regular season. Ellison made his NFL debut as a reserve in Week 1 of the 2009 season. He went on to play in 15 games for the Jaguars in 2009, starting nine at defensive tackle. He finished the season with 28 tackles and one and a half sack. He was waived by the Jaguars on September 4, 2010.

Kansas City Chiefs
The Kansas City Chiefs signed Ellison on October 20, 2010. He was inactive for one game before being waived on October 27, 2010.

New England Patriots
Ellison was signed by the New England Patriots on January 4, 2011, prior to their first playoff game. He was waived on January 8, 2011.

External links
New England Patriots bio
Jacksonville Jaguars bio
Kansas City Chiefs bio
Missouri Tigers bio

1981 births
Living people
Players of American football from St. Louis
American football defensive tackles
American football defensive ends
Coffeyville Red Ravens football players
Missouri Tigers football players
Carolina Panthers players
Houston Texans players
Baltimore Ravens players
San Francisco 49ers players
Jacksonville Jaguars players
Kansas City Chiefs players
New England Patriots players